The Council of State of Cuba is a 31-member body of the government of Cuba, elected by the National Assembly of People's Power.  It has the authority to exercise most legislative power between sessions of the National Assembly of People's Power, subject to its approval, and to call the National Assembly of People's Power into session between its scheduled twice yearly sessions. 

The National Assembly is only in session for a few days each year. Members of the Council of State, which serve in the National Assembly, do not reflect popular outcomes in the elections. According to a 2021 study, under competitive elections, most members of the Council of State might have been defeated. 

The membership consists of a President, a Secretary, a First Vice President, five Vice Presidents, and 27 additional members.  The President, the Secretary, the First Vice President, and the five Vice Presidents are also members of the Council of Ministers. With the passage of the 2019 Cuban Constitution, the post of President of the Council of State will be to the President of the National Assembly, while the functions of the head of state will be transferred from the Council of State to the restored office of President of the Republic.

9th Council of State (2018–2019)

See also

 List of prime ministers of Cuba
 Council of Ministers
 List of presidents of Cuba
 Similar institutions:
 Standing Committee of the National People's Congress of China
 8th Council of State of Cuba

References

Government ministers of Cuba
Government of Cuba
Cuba, Council of State
Government agencies established in 1975
1975 establishments in Cuba